Yongzhou Lingling Airport  is an airport serving the city of Yongzhou in Hunan Province, China.  It is located in Lengshuitan District, 8.8 kilometers from the city center.  The airport was first built in 1938 for military use and expanded several times.  Commercial flights started in 2001, ceased in October 2005, and resumed in January 2008.

Airlines and destinations

See also
List of airports in China
List of the busiest airports in China

References

Airports in Hunan
Airports established in 1938
1938 establishments in China